Ray Klebesadel is a scientist, now retired, who was a member of the gamma-ray astronomy group at the Los Alamos National Laboratory (LANL) in New Mexico that discovered cosmic gamma-ray bursts using data from the Vela satellites, which were deployed by the United States after the Nuclear Test Ban Treaty of 1963, to police the ban on nuclear tests in space.  The unexplained gamma-ray flashes were first found in 1969, in data collected in 1967. Klebesadel has said that contrary to popular belief, the data was never classified. The discovery was published in 1973 as an Astrophysical Journal Letter,  co-authored by Ian Strong and Roy Olson also of LANL, entitled "Observations of Gamma-Ray Bursts of Cosmic Origin". It was published again in 1976 in the Scientific American.

Klebesadel was selected as a Fellow of the Los Alamos National Laboratory in 1989.

References

Living people
Los Alamos National Laboratory personnel
Year of birth missing (living people)